Giambattista Spinola (20 September 1615 – 4 January 1704) was a cardinal of the Catholic Church and an Archbishop of Genoa.

Giambattista was born in Madrid, Spain, the fourth of the twelve children of Luca Spinola and Battina Lomellini. They were immigrants from Genoa in Italy, members of the influential Spinola family of that city, which had long been active in Genoese politics. He was the nephew of Cardinal Giandomenico Spinola. During his career, he participated in three papal conclaves.

Spinola studied law as a young man, receiving the degree of Doctor in utroque iure. At an unknown date he entered Church service. In 1648 he was appointed as archbishop of the Roman Catholic Archdiocese of Acerenza and Matera, while still a deacon.  He became the Archbishop of Genoa in 1664. Additionally he was named as Secretary for the Sacred Congregation of Bishops and Regulars by Pope Clement X, as well as Governor of Rome and Vice Camerlengo of the Holy Roman Church, while retaining the Secretariat of the Sacred Congregation. He served as Governor of Rome from 26 October 1675 until 1 September 1681, when he was named a cardinal, but continued to hold the office with the title pro-Governor until he was succeeded by his nephew of the same name on 28 July 1691. He was forced to resign as Archbishop of Genoa on 16 March 1681 for reasons of health.

Shortly after his resignation, Spinola was named a Cardinal Priest by Pope Innocent XI, with his titular church that of Santa Cecilia in Trastevere in Rome. He served briefly in the position of Chamberlain of the College of Cardinals, a one-year term that ran from January 1691 to January 1692, to which he was reappointed but resigned in March 1692, for reasons of health. In 1696 he opted for the titular church of the Basilica of Sant'Agnese fuori le mura in Rome, a title he held until he opted for that of the Church of Santa Maria in Trastevere in 1698.

Spinola died in his palace in Rome on 4 January 1704. His body was laid out in the Church of San Lorenzo in Lucina, with his burial taking place on 7 March 1704 at the Church of San Salvatore alle Coppelle, in front of the main altar.

References

1615 births
1704 deaths
People from Madrid
Spanish people of Italian descent
People of Ligurian descent
Roman Catholic archbishops of Genoa
Burials at San Salvatore alle Coppelle
17th-century Italian cardinals